Andreas Ramos is an American writer and adjunct professor at California Science and Technology University.

Ramos' firsthand account of the fall of the Berlin Wall was published in several history textbooks. 

In 2001 he held a mock funeral for the internet.

Bibliography

Notes

References

Colombian emigrants to the United States
Heidelberg University alumni
Living people
Year of birth missing (living people)